Raymond Joseph Ellis (17 December 1923 – 20 April 1994) was a British Labour Party politician.

Born in Sheffield, Ellis was MP for North East Derbyshire from 1979 to 1987, when he retired. He died in Sheffield aged 70.

References
The Times Guide to the House of Commons, Times Newspapers Ltd, 1983

External links 
 

1923 births
1994 deaths
Labour Party (UK) MPs for English constituencies
National Union of Mineworkers-sponsored MPs
UK MPs 1979–1983
UK MPs 1983–1987
Members of the Parliament of the United Kingdom for constituencies in Derbyshire